Ana or Anuka (1698–1746) was a Georgian royal princess (batonishvili) of the royal Bagrationi dynasty of House of Mukhrani.

She was a daughter of King Vakhtang VI of Kartli by his wife Rusudan of Circassia.

She married  Prince Vakhushti Abashidze (died 1751) and had 2 children, Levan and Nikoloz.

References

 ბაგრატიონები: სამეცნიერო და კულტურული მემკვიდრეობა, მუხრან-ბატონთა და ბაგრატიონ-მუხრანელთა გენეალოგია, თბილისი, 2003
 მუხრანბატონთა გენეალოგიური ტაბულა: იური ჩიქოვანი, სოსო ბიჭიკაშვილი, დავით ნინიძე / კრებული "არტანუჯი" N 5 - 1996 წ. - გვ.28-36

1698 births
1746 deaths
Princesses from Georgia (country)
House of Mukhrani